Shiv Shikshan Sanstha's English Medium School, located in Sion, Mumbai, sister concern of D.S High School, Sion, Mumbai, which is India's one of the oldest school in Mumbai. The school was founded as a primary school, and became a Secondary school. A majority of students at the school have been Hindus.

Shiv Shikshan Sanstha's English Medium School's,
Students participate in the Boy Scout/Girl Guide movements.
The students of the school are divided among four Houses::Rigveda, Samveda, Yajurveda, Atharvaveda. The houses score points on the strength of their students' performance in sports, quizzes, academic, artistic, cultural and other extracurricular achievements.

Curriculum
SSC

Community
The schools have been active in community activities outside the schools themselves: maintaining local cleanliness, health awareness, serving the elderly adults.

References

External links
Unofficial Page

Private schools in Mumbai